Suzana Nikolić (born 22 June 1965) is a Croatian film, theatre and television actress.

As of 2020, she is teaching acting at the Shanghai Theatre Academy.

Filmography

Television roles

Movie roles

References

External links

1965 births
Living people
Croatian actresses
Croatian stage actresses
Croatian television actresses
Croatian film actresses
Golden Arena winners
People from Županja